Dhunachi is a  incense burner (commonly used in conjunction with Indian Frankincense or "Dhuno" for traditional ceremonies) used for one of the stages during Aarti and ritualized Dance worship in West Bengal, Mithila, Assam, Orrisa, Tripura and Bangladesh during Durga Puja and Kali puja. It is often used following the aarti with the pradip (a lamp with an odd number of wicks).

Description
The dhunachi has a flared shape and is held by a stem with a large cavity at the top, and is traditionally made of earthenware. Dhunachis may have one handle, two handles diametrically opposite to each other or even no handles at all. Brass or silver dhunachi has a longer handle to reduce the effect of heat. 

The earthenware dhunachis are made by potters from clay. After rendering the shape, the dhunachis are first sun dried and then burnt in fire. They may or may not be painted. Every year, potters from the districts such as Nadia or Bankura produce dhunachis on mass scale before Durga Puja. As of 2016, the wholesale price of medium sized earthenware dhunachis in Bankura ranged between ten and twelve rupees, whereas the retail price varied between 20 to 25 rupees.

Usage

The dhunachi is lit by placing burning coal at the bottom, which ignites a layer of slow-burning coconut husk, on which incense (usually resin such as Indian frankincense) is sprinkled. During Durga Puja in eastern India, it is common to have dhunuchi nritya, or a frenzied dance with the censer, to the accompaniment of dhak playing. Many puja traditions also organize contests for the best dance, where some performers may go with as many as three dhunuchis - the third one held between the teeth. Dhunachi arati also known as "dhoop arati".

References

External links

 Dhunuchi Nach video
 Dhunuchi Nach Photo 

Objects used in Hindu worship
Aarti
Durga Puja
Incense equipment